'38 – Vienna Before the Fall is a 1987 Austrian-West German co-produced drama film directed by Wolfgang Glück. It was nominated for the Academy Award for Best Foreign Language Film at the 59th Academy Awards. The German title is literally translated as '38 - That, too, was Vienna', but it is also known in English as '38 - Vienna Before the Fall. It is set in Vienna in 1937–1938 at the time of the Anschluss.

Cast

See also
 List of submissions to the 59th Academy Awards for Best Foreign Language Film
 List of Austrian submissions for the Academy Award for Best Foreign Language Film

References

External links
 
 

1987 films
1980s political drama films
Austrian drama films
West German films
Films based on Austrian novels
1980s German-language films
Films set in 1937
Films set in 1938
Films about Nazi Germany
Films set in Austria
German political drama films
1986 drama films
1986 films
1987 drama films
1980s German films